Gilbert is a given name of Norman-French origin, itself from Germanic Gisilberht or Gisalberht. Original spellings included Gislebert, Guilbert and Gilebert.  The first element, Gil-, comes from Germanic gīsil, meaning "shaft of an arrow" or gisal "pledge, hostage", while the second element, -bert comes from Germanic -behrt, short form of beraht, meaning "bright" or "famous". 
The name spread in France and was introduced to England by the Normans, where it was popular during the Middle Ages. That is the reason the pronunciation Gil-  reflects the Northern Norman one , as opposed to Old French  > French  and explains the alternative spelling Guilbert with Guil- .

Variant spellings have evolved throughout Europe, including the Iberian/Italian version Gilberto and, as was the custom across Europe, given a Latin language version Gilbertus, to be used alongside a person's native variant. The diminutive, Gil, eventually became popular as a standalone given name or nickname.  Gilbert, with variant spellings, is also used as a surname (see Gilbert (surname)).

Translations 
 Arabic: غيلبرت
 Belarusian: Гілберт ( Hilbiert)
 Bengali: গিলবার্ট ( Gilabārṭa)
 Chinese Simplified: 吉尔伯特 (Jí'ěr bó tè)
 Chinese Traditional: 吉爾伯特 (Jí'ěr bó tè)
 French: Gilbert
 German: Gilbert
 Gujarati: ગિલ્બર્ટ ( Gilbarṭa)
 Hebrew: גילברט
 Hindi: गिल्बर्ट ( Gilbarṭ)
 Italian: Gilberto
 Japanese: ギルバート ( Girubāto)
 Kannada: ಗಿಲ್ಬರ್ಟ್ ( Gilbarṭ)
 Korean: 길버트 (Gilbeoteu)
 Lithuanian: Gilbertas
 Macedonian: Гилберт
 Marathi: गिल्बर्ट ( Gilbarṭa)
 Mongolian: Гилберт ( Gilbyert)
 Nepali: गिल्बर्ट (Gilbarṭa)
 Persian: گیلبرت
 Portuguese: Gilberto
 Russian: Гилберт
 Serbian: Гилберт
 Spanish: Gilberto
 Tamil: கில்பர்ட் ( Kilparṭ)
 Telugu: గిల్బర్ట్ ( Gilbarṭ)
 Thai: กิลเบิร์ต ( Kilbeir̒)
 Turkish: Jilbert, Jilber
 Ukrainian: Гілберт ( Hilbert)
 Urdu: گلبرٹ
 Yiddish: גילבערט ( Gylbʻrt)

People with the name 
 Saint Gilbert (disambiguation), multiple persons
 Gilbert (Archdeacon of Lismore), early 13th-century Irish Catholic priest
 Gilbert, Count of Brionne (c. 1000–c. 1040), French noble
 Gilbert, Count of Gravina (fl. 1159–1167), Norman French noble in Italy
 Gilbert, Count of Montpensier (1443–1496), French noble
 Gilbert of Glenluce (died 1253), Scottish, 13th-century Cistercian monk, abbot and bishop
 Gilbert of Sempringham (c. 1083–1190), the only Englishman to found a monastic order
 Gilbertus Anglicus or Gilbert of England (c. 1180 – c. 1250), English physician
 Gilbert Arenas (born 1982), professional basketball player
 Gilbert Bécaud (1927–2001), French singer, composer, pianist and actor 
 Gilbert Brown (born 1971), American football player
 Gilbert Brulé (born 1987), Canadian ice hockey player
 Gilbert Buatère, Norman adventurer, one of the principal commanders of Battle of Cannae (1018)
 Gilbert Bundy (1911–1955), American cartoonist and illustrator
 Sir Gilbert Thomas Carter, administrative officer in the Royal Navy and a colonial official for the British Empire, administrator for Gambia, governor for the Lagos Colony, governor for The Bahamas and Barbados and governor for Trinidad and Tobago
 Gilbert Cates (1934–2011), American film director and television producer
 Gilbert Cavan (died 1420), Scottish cleric
 G. K. Chesterton (Gilbert Keith Chesterton, 1874–1936), English writer
 Gilbert Crispin (c. 1055–1117), Anglo-Norman monk appointed abbot, proctor, and servant of Westminster Abbey
 Gilbert Cruz (born 1980), Puerto Rican professional wrestler
 Gilbert de Beauregard Robinson (1906–1992), Canadian mathematician
 Gilbert de Chambrun (1909–2009), French politician
 Gilbert de Clare, 1st Earl of Pembroke (c. 1100–1148), Anglo-Norman earl
 Gilbert de la Porrée or Gilbertus Porretanus (1070–1154), French scholastic logician and theologian
 Gilbert Doucet (1956–2020), French rugby union player
 Gilbert du Motier, Marquis de Lafayette (1757–1834), French general and politician who fought in the American Revolution and was involved in the French Revolution
 Gilbert Eisner, American fencer
Gilbert John Elliot-Murray-Kynynmound, 4th Earl of Minto, British peer and politician who served as Governor General of Canada, the eighth since Canadian Confederation, and as Viceroy and 17th Governor-General of India
 Gilbert Franklin (1919–2004), American sculptor, educator.
 Gilbert Gottfried (1955–2022), American actor and stand-up comedian
 Gilbert Greenall (humanitarian advisor) (born 1954), UN Humanitarian advisor
Gilbert Gress (born 1941), French football coach and former football player
 Gil Hodges (1924–1972), American baseball player
 Gilbert von In der Maur (1887–1959), Austrian SS leader and journalist
 Gilbert Khunwane (born 1977), Batswana boxer
 Gilbert Levin  (born 1948), American conductor
 Gilbert Mamery (1927–2003), Puerto Rican disc-jockey, musicologist, radio station owner, radio and television personality, marketing impresario, and composer
 Gilbert Marouani (1933–2016), Tunisian-born music producer and agent
 Gilbert Melendez (born 1982), American mixed martial artist
 Gilbert Daniel Nessim (born 1966), chemistry professor at Bar-Ilan University
 Gilbert Ouy (1924–2011), French historian, palaeographer and librarian
 Gilbert Reaney (1924–2008), English musicologist
 Gilbert Rozon (born 1954), Canadian impresario
 Gilbert O'Sullivan (born 1946), stage name of Irish musician Raymond Edward O'Sullivan
 Gilbert Pena (born 1949), Texas politician
 Gilbert E. Patterson (1939–2007), American Pentecostal clergyman
 Gilbert Stuart (1755–1828), American painter
 Gilbert Tosetti (1879–1923), English cricketer
 Gilbert Tuhabonye (born 1974), American long-distance runner
 Gilbert F. White (1911–2006), American geographer

Fictional characters 
 Gilbert, a cat in the Canadian children's television series Caillou
 Gilbert, an anthropomorphic globe from Don't Hug Me I'm Scared
 Gilbert Bates, a recurring character in the television series Leave It to Beaver
 Gilbert Beilschmidt, the human name of the personification of Prussia in the anime series Hetalia: Axis Powers
 Gilbert Blythe, a character in the novel series Anne of Green Gables by Lucy Maud Montgomery
 Gilbert Bougainvillea, a major in the Leidenschaftlich army from the anime and manga Violet Evergarden
 Gilbert Cocteau, one of the main characters of the manga series Kaze to Ki no Uta 
 Gilbert Dauterive, the cousin of the Bill Dauterive in the animated television series King of the Hill
 Gilbert Grape, the eponymous character of the 1993 film What's Eating Gilbert Grape
 Gil Grissom, a forensic entomologist in the television series CSI: Crime Scene Investigation
 Gibert Huph, a character in the 2004 Disney/Pixar animated film The Incredibles
 Gilbert G.P. Guilford, the commander of the Glaston Knights in the anime series Code Geass
 Gilbert Markham, the principal narrator of the novel The Tenant of Wildfell Hall by Anne Brontë
 Gilbert Nightray, a character in the manga and anime series Pandora Hearts

Popularity
In England and Wales, Gilbert ranked 64th in popularity in 1904, 72nd in 1914 and 95th in 1924.  By 1934 it had dropped out of the Top 100.

See also 
 Gilberto
 Gille Brigte (disambiguation)
 Gislebertus, 12th-century sculptor

References 

British Isles given names
English masculine given names
French masculine given names
German masculine given names
Dutch masculine given names
Given names